Mai Treial (born 22 May 1952) is an Estonian politician who served as a Riigikogu member from 1995 until 2011.

Biography
A 1987 graduate of University of Tartu, she served in several government positions in Jõgeva County, including Secretary of State, and was a member of Jõgeva City Council from 1993 to 2005.

Treial is a Commander of the Order of Merit of the Republic of Italy (2005) and a Fourth Class recipient Order of the White Star (2002). She has a son and a daughter.

On 8 January 2013, Treial was elected as Chairman of Jõgeva City Council.

References

1952 births
Living people
University of Tartu alumni
Commanders of the Order of Merit of the Italian Republic
Recipients of the Order of the White Star, 4th Class
Members of the Riigikogu, 1995–1999
Members of the Riigikogu, 1999–2003
Members of the Riigikogu, 2003–2007
Members of the Riigikogu, 2007–2011
Women members of the Riigikogu
People from Elva Parish
20th-century Estonian politicians
21st-century Estonian politicians
21st-century Estonian women politicians